Evert van Milligen  (born 1948 in Otterlo) is a Dutch politician and former Chartered Accountant. As a member of the People's Party for Freedom and Democracy (Volkspartij voor Vrijheid en Democratie) he was a member of the municipal council of Ede from 2002 to 2008. Since 2008 he has been an alderman of the same municipality.

See also 
List of Dutch politicians

References 

1948 births
Living people
Aldermen in Gelderland
Dutch accountants
Dutch bloggers
Municipal councillors in Gelderland
People from Ede, Netherlands
People's Party for Freedom and Democracy politicians